Shi Islet (also Shi Yu, Shih Yü, Shiyu, Shiyu Islet and Lion Islet) is an islet located northwest of Lesser Kinmen (Lieyu) in Lieyu Township, Kinmen County (Quemoy), Fujian Province, Republic of China (Taiwan). Military personnel are stationed on Shi Islet. 

The islet was originally named Shu Islet. The present name is given by Chiang Ching-kuo during his visits to military bases in Kinmen, this is adopted in 1960.

History

After 0:00 AM on July 7, 1953, People's Liberation Army 31st Army 92nd Division landed on Shu Islet to start an attack to ROC troop, leading 3 killed and 4 captured.

In January 1985, a local Chinese sampan with eight fishermen suffered from the engine breakdown floated onshore the Islet. After the emergency communication identifying themself as civilians, Kinmen Defense Command ordered the stationed platoon through landline to kill all regardless - six died under crossfire and two escaped to a rock cave and kneeled down begging for mercy, but still were pushed off the rock cliff to fall to death under the KDC's urgent call again. Searching the sampan later only found a home letter draft from a son on having collected sufficient yarn for his mother to knit a sweater to pass the winter. The corpses were covered under the beach west of the harbor, then the soldiers were strongly warned not to leak out any information and transferred to another post in Kinmen main island.

At around 4 PM on August 19, 2016, a 23 year old Chinese man landed on Shi Islet after rowing from Xiamen Island (Amoy) on a piece of polystyrene and was immediately arrested by the Shi Islet defense forces.

On July 23, 2019, Ho Cheng (賀政), the new leader of the ROC Army Kinmen Defense Command (陸軍金門防衛指揮部), visited the soldiers on Shi Islet and Menghu Islet.

Geography

In popular culture
The islet appeared in the 2010 Japanese movie Liar Game: The Final Stage.

Gallery

See also
 List of islands of Taiwan

References

External links
中部地區巡防局第九海岸巡防總隊105年8月20日聯合獅嶼駐軍緝獲陸籍偷渡男子  from the Coast Guard Administration, Central Branch (海洋委員會海巡署中部分署)

Islands of Fujian, Republic of China
Landforms of Kinmen County
Lions in culture